P. K. Abdu Rabb is an Indian politician and a former member of Kerala Legislative Assembly from the Indian Union Muslim League who served as Kerala's minister for education during the second Oommen Chandy ministry. He represented the Tirurangadi constituency of Malappuram district in Kerala.

Early life
P.K. Abdu Rabb is the son of the former deputy chief minister of Kerala, K. Avukader Kutty Naha. He gained a master's degree in English Literature.

Green chalkboards in schools

He experimented with "green boards" in Malappuram, asserting that such boards are the international norm.

See also
 Government of Kerala
 Kerala Ministers

References

External links 

 Education Minister's Official Website

State cabinet ministers of Kerala
Living people
1948 births
Indian Union Muslim League politicians
People from Malappuram district
Kerala MLAs 2011–2016
Kerala MLAs 2016–2021
Education Ministers of Kerala